{{DISPLAYTITLE:C27H45IO}}
The molecular formula C27H45IO (molar mass: 512.55 g/mol, exact mass: 512.2515 u) may refer to:

 Adosterol
 Iodocholesterol, or 19-iodocholesterol